The sixth season of 7th Heaven—an American family-drama television series, created and produced by Brenda Hampton—premiered on September 24, 2001, on The WB, and concluded on May 20, 2002 (22 episodes). This is the last season in which Jessica Biel is considered a main cast member.

Cast and characters 
Stephen Collins as Eric Camden
Catherine Hicks as Annie Camden
Barry Watson as Matt Camden
David Gallagher as Simon Camden
Jessica Biel as Mary Camden
Beverley Mitchell as Lucy Camden
Mackenzie Rosman as Ruthie Camden
Nikolas and Lorenzo Brino as Sam and David Camden
Adam LaVorgna as Robbie Palmer
Happy as Happy the Dog

Recurring
Sarah Danielle Madison as Sarah Glass-Camden (episodes 15-22)

Episodes

References

2001 American television seasons
2002 American television seasons